David Paul Campbell is an American musician and songwriter.

Campbell was briefly a student at the University of Georgia before pursuing music, falling in first with old high school classmate Ry Cooder, then Taj Mahal. During his time in Atlanta, he was president of the Atlanta Folk Music Society. He plays guitar, mandolin, Hammond organ, bouzouki, dulcimer, keyboards and harmonica. A longtime touring musician, sideman and accompanist, Campbell toured with pioneer bluesman Buddy Moss in the 1960s. He played behind Sam Chatmon and toured with or opened for Dave Mason, Maria Muldaur, Ten Years After, Poco and several more.

Campbell figures into the history of The Doors through a brief 1975 stint in Butts Band, a group founded by ex-Doors Robbie Krieger and John Densmore. He appears on neither of the band’s two LPs.

Campbell has an extensive solo catalog and continues to perform in and around Santa Cruz, California. He also founded Mudbug International Music with his wife, Jessie Lilley. He’s recorded and written songs with Loretta McNair and Todd Handley, among others.

Songs include: "Whiskey in My Coffee", "Revolving Door", "She Said Nothin'", "Fannin Street", "Shovelhead Rag" and "Swing Baby".

References

Living people
American blues guitarists
American male guitarists
American rock guitarists
American mandolinists
University of Georgia alumni
Year of birth missing (living people)